The 1962 Grand National was the 116th renewal of the Grand National horse race that took place at Aintree Racecourse near Liverpool, England, on 31 March 1962.

The race was won by Kilmore, a 28/1 shot ridden by jockey Fred Winter. The 12-year-old horse was trained by Ryan Price. Wyndburgh was second, and Mr. What finished third. Thirty-two horses ran and all returned safely to the stables.

Finishing order

Non-finishers

Media coverage

The BBC covered its third Grand National with David Coleman again at the helm on Grand National Grandstand. Peter O'Sullevan, Bob Haynes and Peter Montague-Evans provided the commentary.

References

 1962
Grand National
Grand National
20th century in Lancashire
March 1962 sports events in the United Kingdom